Grace A. Paull (1898–1990) was an American artist, illustrator, and author. She designed greeting cards, illustrated children's books, and painted people, landscapes and flowers.

Life and career 
Paull was born in 1898 in Cold Brook, New York. She went to high school in Montreal, Canada and then Utica Free Academy where she studied under Mabel E. Northrup. She continued her art studies at Pratt Institute in Brooklyn for three years and after graduating from there at  Art Students League and Grand Central Art School in New York City.

After art school, Paull designed greeting cards for several years. In 1932, Paull started her career of being a children's book illustrator. She was also the author of some of the books she illustrated.

Paull made her home in Cold Brook, where she lived in the historic Cold Brook Feed Mill.

Paull died in 1990.

Collections
Her work is included in the collections of the Munson-Williams-Proctor Arts Institute and the National Gallery of Art. Illustrations by Paull are included in the Grace Paull Collection at the University of Minnesota Libraries.

Selected works 
 Tops and Whistles (1927), illustrator
 Children of the Handicrafts (1935), illustrator
 Little Girl with Seven Names (1936), illustrator
 Benjie's Hat (1938, illustrator
 Dancing Tom by Elizabeth Coatsworth (1938), illustrator
 Homespun Playdays (1941), illustrator
 Forgotten Island (1942), illustrator
 The Middle Sister by Miriam E. Mason (1947), illustrator
 Crazy Creek by Evelyn Sibley Lampman (1948), illustrator
 The Little Haymakers (1949), illustrator
 The Bounces of Cynthiann by Evelyn Sibley Lampman (1950), illustrator
 The Wonderful Baker (1950), illustrator
 Snowed-In Hill (1953), author and illustrator
 Come to the City (1959), author and illustrator

References

Further reading
 Grace Paull: Author and illustrator of children's books by Gertrude F. Johns, Pine Tree Press (1994) )

1898 births
1990 deaths
American illustrators
American women illustrators
American children's book illustrators
American children's writers
20th-century American women artists
20th-century American women writers
Artists from New York (state)
Writers from New York (state)